Abū Jaʿfar Muḥammad ibn ʿAlī ibn Muḥammad ibn ʿAlī ibn Mūsā ibn Jaʿfar was the son of Ali al-Hadi and the brother of Hasan al-Askari, the 10th and 11th Twelver Shia Imams, respectively. His Tomb was constructed between Samarra and Kazmeen that is situated about 93 kilometers north of Baghdad in Balad.  

The section of the Shia believed that the Awaited Imam Mahdi was Muhammad ibn Ali al-Hadi, who was put into occultation (Ghaybah) by the rule of Allah as the Abbasids wanted him killed in intent to remove the Imamat from existence, he reappeared a few times for short period of times and went back in to the large occultation (Ghaybah al-Kubrā).

Attack on Shrine
On July 7, 2016, at least 40 people were killed and over 74 injured after a group of attackers stormed the Mausoleum.  The attackers included suicide car bombers, suicide bombers on foot, and several gunmen. They attacked Shi'ite pilgrims celebrating Eid al-Fitr.

In the past, there was bombing and sectarian bloodshed in Samarra, where Imam Ali al-Hadi and eleventh Imam of Twelver Hassan al-Askari, the father and brother of Muhammad bin Ali al-Hadi are buried.

Works/books about him 
Among the books/works written by Shiite scholars about Sayyid Muhammad, we can mention:
 "Abu Jaafar Muhammad bin Ali Al-Hadi Saba Al-Dajil" written by Allameh Adib Muhammad Ali Urdubadi;
 "Kramat al-Sayyid Abi Jafar" written by Sheikh Jaber Al Abdul Ghaffar Kashmiri;
 "Ziyarat al-Sayyid Muhammad bin al-Imam Ali al-Hadi" by Ahmad Abdullah Adi Qatifi;
"Saba al-Dajil" by Seyyed Musa Mousavi Handi;
"Saba al-Dajil al-Sayyid Muhammad Najl al-Imam al-Hadi (a.s.)" by Siddique Abu Bakr Da'ibal;
 "Al-Sayed Muhammad Salil Al-Hadi" from Iyad Eidan Beldawi;
 "Zakry Abi Jafar Muhammad bin Al-Imam Al-Hadi" from Sheikh Ali, the son of Sheikh Hassan Khaqani;
 "Resalah fi Karamat al-Sayyid Muhammad bin al-Imam Ali al-Hadi" authored by Sheikh Hashem Beldawi;
 "Kramat al-Sayyid Muhammad bin al-Imam al-Hadi, known as Saba al-Dajil" by Mothir Saeed Mohamalsan al-Ghim
"Saba al-Dajil, Sayyid Muhammad bin al-Imam al-Hadi, the uncle of al-Imam al-Mahdi" by Sayyid Hossein al-Awami;
 "Al-Sayyid Muhammad bin Al-Imam Ali Al-Hadi Waqfa Ali Atab Saba Al-Dajil" by Seyed Murtaza Hosni Sandi;
 "Al-Fada'il al-Mukherjee al-Nafea liyum al-Akhela fi karamat al-Sayyid Muhammad bin Ali al-Hadi (AS)" by Seyyed Qasim Hosseini Baladi Qari.

See also
Descendants of Ali ibn Abi Talib
Ali al-Hadi Mausoleum attack
Jafar ibn Ali al-Hadi
Muhammad al-Mahdi
Sayyid Ali Akbar

References

Firaq al-Shi’ah (The Shi'ah Groups), by Abu Muhammad al-Hasan bin Musa al-Nubakhti, pg.93, 96, 98 and 105
Al-Maqalat wa al-Firaq, by Sa'ad Ibn Abdillah al-Ash'ari al-Qummi (d. 301), pg.101 and 106-108

Husaynids
Family of Muhammad
Shia imams
9th-century Arabs
Iraqi Shia Muslims
9th-century people from the Abbasid Caliphate